The Daughters of the Holy Heart of Mary (French: Filles du Saint-Cœur de Marie) is a Roman Catholic religious institute, founded in Senegal on May 24, 1858 by Aloyse Kobès. It was the first indigenous religious institute in Africa.

Kobès became the first Vicar Apostolic of Senegambia. The first nuns were Thérèse Sagna and Louise de Saint-Jean, the first African nuns outside Ethiopia.

References

External links
150 years of the Daughters of the Holy Heart of Mary
 « 150 ans de la congrégation des Filles du Saint Cœur de Marie : Un jubilé sous le signe de la grâce et de la rétrospective » (article dans Le Soleil) 

Catholic female orders and societies
Religious organizations established in 1858
Catholic Church in Senegal
1858 establishments in Senegal